RedCard 2003, known as RedCard in Europe, is a video game based on association football, released in 2002 by Point of View.  The game follows most of the rules of football, but allows for heavy tackles and special moves once the player has charged up a special meter.

The game, released on the Nintendo GameCube, Xbox, and PlayStation 2, allows the player to compete across all the continents (including Antarctica) in a world conquest mode, which in turn unlocks the finals mode (World Cup). On each continent, the player begins against an easy team and faces increasingly more difficult opponents.

Brian McBride is depicted in the game's American cover art. He is replaced by Vinnie Jones, along with the head of Ryan Giggs superimposed on a generic footballer's body, in the PAL region.

Reception

The game received "average" reviews on all platforms according to the review aggregation website Metacritic. In Japan, where the PlayStation 2 version was ported for release under the name  on June 27, 2002, Famitsu gave it a score of 26 out of 40.

Maxim gave the PS2 version four stars out of five, saying, "Nothing jazzes up a sport better than flagrant infractions." BBC Sport gave it 77%, saying, "While this is definitely not a game to for serious fans, for those who want a half decent footie title with lots of fun extras - then Red Card [sic] makes a great alternative." Playboy gave it 75%, saying, "The game's too footloose for FIFA fans, not outrageous enough for Blitz devotees."

References

External links

2002 video games
Association football video games
GameCube games
Midway video games
PlayStation 2 games
Video games developed in the United States
Video games set in 2003
Xbox games
RenderWare games